Siar Kola (also Romanized as Sīār Kolā) is a village in Ahlamerestaq-e Jonubi Rural District, in the Central District of Mahmudabad County, Mazandaran Province, Iran. At the 2006 census, its population was 817, in 210 families.

References 

Populated places in Mahmudabad County